was a village located in Shimoina District, Nagano Prefecture, Japan.

As of 2003, the village had an estimated population of 766 and a density of 13.38 persons per km². The total area was 57.24 km².

On January 1, 2006, Namiai was merged into the expanded village of Achi.

Namiai is host to the Nagano-Namiai Camp: http://www.campnamiai.com/

Dissolved municipalities of Nagano Prefecture
Achi, Nagano